St. Jude High School may refer to:
St Jude High School (Pune), school in Pune, Maharashtra, India
 St. Jude Educational Institute, school in Montgomery, Alabama, United States